David K. Bernard (born November 20, 1956 in Baton Rouge, Louisiana) is an American New Testament scholar and Oneness Pentecostal theologian. He currently serves as the General Superintendent of the United Pentecostal Church International, the largest Oneness Pentecostal organization with constituents worldwide. He teaches as a Professor of Biblical Studies and Apostolic Leadership at Urshan Graduate School of Theology, where he also serves as Chancellor.

Career
David Bernard was the founder of New Life Church of Austin, Texas, out of which 16 additional churches were started under his leadership. He was also the founding president of Urshan College and Urshan Graduate School of Theology and currently teaches as a Professor of Biblical Studies and Apostolic Leadership at Urshan Graduate School of Theology. He received his Master of Theology and Doctor of Theology in New Testament from the University of South Africa, his Juris Doctor with honors from the University of Texas, and a Bachelor of Arts magna cum laude in mathematical sciences and managerial studies from Rice University.

He has authored 37 books with a reported circulation of 900,000 in 39 languages. His works are commonly referred to in understanding the beliefs of Oneness Pentecostals. His book, The New Birth (1984), is said to have been used more extensively than any other to demonstrate the beliefs of Oneness Pentecostals since published. Other works regarded as notable include The Oneness of God (1983) and The Oneness of Jesus Christ (1994).

Bernard has also engaged in scholarly dialogue with trinitarians which has been welcomed by some in the wider pentecostal community. A "Trinity-Oneness Dialogue" also emerged at Society for Pentecostal Studies during this time. Bernard chaired the Oneness team. More recently, Amos Young, a professor at Fuller Theological Seminary, wrote that his work "marks the emerging maturation of the Oneness Pentecostal academy."

Works

Thesis

Books

Edited by

References

External links
UPCI General Superintendent

1956 births
Living people
20th-century American theologians
20th-century Christian biblical scholars
21st-century American theologians
21st-century Christian biblical scholars
American biblical scholars
American evangelists
New Testament scholars
Oneness Pentecostalism
Oneness Pentecostals
Pentecostal theologians
Pentecostal writers
Rice University alumni
United Pentecostal Church International
University of Texas alumni